John Michael Quinn Sr. (died 5 August 1954) was an Australian rules footballer for the Port Adelaide Football Club, captaining the club from 1904 to 1905.

Early life 
John was the eldest of 7 children born to Michael Quinn and Mary Sidoli.

Junior Football 

John began playing for local club Semaphore Central in the early 1890s.

Goldfields (1895–1899) 
In 1895 John left for the Western Australian Goldfields for employment. During his years in Western Australia he played in the strong Goldfields competition for Kanowna Football Club (known as White Feather).

Return to Port Adelaide  
John returned home and began playing for Port Adelaide around 1900.

Personal life 
John Quinn Sr. was the father of future league footballers John Quinn Jr, Tom, Bob, and George. Both Tom and Bob Quinn would win premierships with Port Adelaide. Tom Quinn would later play for Geelong and is honoured in their team of the century. Likewise Bob Quinn is honoured in Port Adelaide's team of the century.

References 

Port Adelaide Football Club (SANFL) players
Port Adelaide Football Club players (all competitions)
1954 deaths
Australian rules footballers from South Australia
Australian people of Italian descent
Australian people of Irish descent
1875 births